The Austrian Alpine Ski Championships are the national championships in alpine skiing, organised every year by the Austrian Ski Federation (ÖSV).

Results

Men

Women

References

External links
  

Alpine skiing competitions in Austria
Recurring sporting events established in 1932
National alpine skiing championships
Alpine